Ilan Qarah-ye Sofla (also Romanized as Īlān Qarah-ye Soflá; also known as Īlānqarah-ye Pā'īn) is a village in Chaybasar-e Jonubi Rural District, in the Central District of Maku County, West Azerbaijan Province, Iran. At the 2006 census, its population was 87, in 18 families.

References 

Populated places in Maku County